The Thomas Ranken Lyle Medal is awarded at most every two years by the Australian Academy of Science to a mathematician or physicist for his or her outstanding research accomplishments. It is named after Thomas Ranken Lyle, an Irish mathematical physicist who became a professor at the University of Melbourne.  The award takes the form of a bronze medal bearing the design of the head of Thomas Lyle, as sculpted by Rayner Hoff.

The medal was founded by the Australian National Research Council (ANRC) in 1932, and first awarded in 1935. When the Australian Academy of Science was established in 1954, it took over the roles of the ANRC, including administration of the medal.

Recipients

See also

 List of mathematics awards
 List of physics awards

References

Mathematics awards
Physics awards
Awards established in 1932
Australian Academy of Science Awards
Australian science and technology awards